Systomus subnasutus is a species of freshwater ray-finned fish from the family Cyprinidae which is found in India. It was previously considered a subspecies of the olive barb (Systomus sarana).

References

Systomus
Freshwater fish of India
Fish described in 1842